Garrett is a city in Keyser Township, DeKalb County, Indiana, United States. The population was 6,286 at the 2010 census.

History
Garrett was platted in 1875 when the Baltimore and Ohio Railroad was extended to that point. It was named for John W. Garrett (1820–1884), president of the Baltimore and Ohio Railroad from 1858 to 1884. Garrett was incorporated as a city in 1875.

Geography
Garrett is located at  (41.347903, -85.133700).

Garrett sits just west of Auburn, a larger town and county seat of DeKalb County. Both Garrett and Auburn are about 15 miles north of Fort Wayne.

Demographics

2010 census
As of the 2010 United States Census, there were 6,286 people in the city of Garrett, Indiana. The city grew 8.32% since the 2000 United States Census.

The city was 47.95% male (3,014) and 52.05% female (3,272).

The racial makeup of the city was:

The age of the population was:

2000 census
As of the census of 2000, there were 5,803 people, 2,185 households, and 1,516 families residing in the city. The racial makeup of the city was 97.47% White, 0.29% African American, 0.33% Native American, 0.50% Asian, 0.16% Pacific Islander, 0.62% from other races, and 0.64% from two or more races. Hispanic or Latino of any race were 2.07% of the population.

There were 2,185 households, out of which 36.8% had children under the age of 18 living with them, 52.9% were married couples living together, 12.1% had a female householder with no husband present, and 30.6% were non-families. 25.6% of all households were made up of individuals, and 10.9% had someone living alone who was 65 years of age or older. The average household size was 2.63 and the average family size was 3.15.

In the city, the population was spread out, with 28.7% under the age of 18, 9.7% from 18 to 24, 31.1% from 25 to 44, 19.1% from 45 to 64, and 11.3% who were 65 years of age or older. The median age was 32 years. For every 100 females, there were 94.5 males. For every 100 females age 18 and over, there were 92.5 males.

The median income for a household in the city was $41,747, and the median income for a family was $48,403. Males had a median income of $35,814 versus $22,389 for females. The per capita income for the city was $17,260. About 4.1% of families and 6.0% of the population were below the poverty line, including 6.0% of those under age 18 and 11.7% of those age 65 or over.

Education 
The city of Garrett lies in the school district of Garrett-Keyser-Butler Community Schools. Local schools are:

The town is served by the Garrett Public Library, one of four public libraries in Dekalb County.

Important buildings
The Garrett Community Mausoleum, Garrett Historic District, J.H. Haag House, Keyser Township School 8, Mountz House, Henry Peters House, and John Wilderson House are listed on the National Register of Historic Places.

St. Joseph Catholic church, built in 1929 is part of the Roman Catholic Diocese of Fort Wayne-South Bend, is an Italian-style church, more than a century old. It operates St. Joseph Catholic School in Garrett and previously managed Sacred Heart Hospital.

Sacred Heart Hospital, standing at 220 South Ijams St, was built in 1902.  It was run by nuns from the Order of the Franciscan Sisters of the Sacred Heart.  It became the Garrett Community Hospital when the sisters stopped managing the hospital.  The structure was listed on the National Register of Historic Places in 1983.

For years, the building remained largely unused until renovated in 2003.  It had forty-two apartments for senior citizens. In 2010, the residency requirement were changed allowing the population at large to have access to the Sacred Heart Apartments.  The facility is currently managed by New Generation Management based in Fort Wayne.

In 2005 the DeKalb County YMCA Community Center was opened at 1200 East Houston St.  Which is now called the Judy A. Morrill  center or The JAM.  This facility was designed and built with the community in mind.  There is a zero entry pool, allowing handicapped individuals to use a ramp to enter the pool.  This pool also offers a water slide and splash pads for children.  The fitness room provides free weights, aerobic machines, and weight machines.  There is also a large gymnasium and playground at the facility.  Daycare and after school services are available for families.

In January 2011 control of the facility changed to become the Judy A. Morrill Recreation Center, or J.A.M. Rec Center.  Many classes and activities are offered, including scrap-booking, Yoga, swimming and fitness classes, bingo, and more.

Another important landmark in the city is its Garrett Fire Department, which originally had its headquarters in the City Hall. Until joining with the Police Department to make a new station in 1996. The GFD has been saving life and property in Garrett and the surrounding communities since 1879.

High School and Athletics
Garrett High school has been around since 1922. In 2001 a new middle school section of the school was completed and added to the existing school. In 2011 the school began construction on yet another new section of the building. This new section greatly increased the size of the high school it was finished in early 2013. Garrett has been one of the highest ranked school in Northern Indiana, their motto is to "Be The One".  The high-school teams all play 3A in the Northeast Corner Conference while the middle school plays in the Tri-County Athletic Conference.l and the Jr.- NECC. Their team mascot is a Locomotives and the high school are called the Railroaders. The middle school go by the Locomotives coincidentally.
Garrett football 1974 class A ISHAA Football Champs.

Newspaper/Media
The Garrett Clipper, serving the Garrett and area community in southern DeKalb County, Ind., was purchased by KPC Media Group Inc. on Oct. 1, 1999, from Wayne and Pat Bartles. The Clipper of Garrett was formed in 1885 by A.J. Little and H. E. Little and is the oldest operating business in the city. The editor and publisher of The Clipper is Sue Carpenter, who joined KPC in 1974.  Fort Wayne news channel 15, "Wane 15, coverage you can count on."

Notable people

 Thomas Taggart - mayor of Indianapolis, 1895–1901, lived in Garrett, 1874–1877, as manager of B&O Railroad depot restaurant.
 Rollie Zeider - major league baseball player, 1910–1918, played for Chicago White Sox, New York Yankees, Chicago Chi-Feds, Chicago Whales and Chicago Cubs. He ran a restaurant in Garrett after he retired from professional baseball.
 John Bowers - silent film star, was born and raised in Garrett. He appeared in more than 90 silent films and his career came to a tragic end with the advent of the "talkies." He committed suicide by rowing a boat into the Pacific Ocean and drowning. He was an avid sailor and owned a  yacht at one time. He was married to and starred alongside Marguerite De La Motte. He has a star on the Hollywood Walk of Fame.
 Wayne Schurr - former pitcher for the Chicago Cubs.

References

External links

 Town of Garrett, Indiana website
 John W. Garrett Biography 

Cities in DeKalb County, Indiana
Cities in Indiana
Populated places established in 1875
1875 establishments in Indiana